Paul Collins (born January 12, 1969) is an American writer, editor and Chair of English at Portland State University, in Portland, Oregon.  He is best known for his work with McSweeney's and The Believer, as editor of the Collins Library imprint for McSweeney's Books, and for his appearances on National Public Radio's Weekend Edition Saturday with Scott Simon. His own books deal primarily with quirky forgotten figures from history, sometimes interwoven with memoir. Damian Kulash of the band OK Go has stated that the chapter in Collins' book "Banvard's Folly" about Augustus Pleasonton's patent on blue light led to them naming their third album Of the Blue Colour of the Sky.

Biography
Collins was born in 1969 in Perkiomenville, Pennsylvania, and graduated from the University of California, Davis, and College of William and Mary. He is married to the children's author and illustrator Jennifer Elder. He is the parent of an autistic child and is known for his writings on the subject of autism. His book on the subject, Not Even Wrong, was adapted by Oliver Goldstick into the play Wild Boy. Collins was awarded a Guggenheim Fellowship in 2009.

Books
 Community Writing: Researching Social Issues Through Composition (Erlbaum, 2001) 
 Banvard's Folly: Thirteen Tales of Renowned Obscurity, Famous Anonymity, and Rotten Luck (Picador USA, 2001) 
 Sixpence House: Lost in a Town of Books (Bloomsbury, 2003) 
 Not Even Wrong: Adventures in Autism (Bloomsbury, 2004) 
 The Trouble with Tom: The Strange Afterlife and Times of Thomas Paine (Bloomsbury, 2005) 
 The Book of William: How Shakespeare's First Folio Conquered the World (Bloomsbury, 2009) 
 The Murder of the Century: The Gilded Age Crime That Scandalized a City and Sparked the Tabloid Wars (Crown, 2011) 
 Duel With the Devil: The True Story of How Alexander Hamilton And Aaron Burr Teamed Up to Take On America's First Sensational Murder Mystery (Crown, 2013) 
 Edgar Allan Poe: The Fever Called Living (New Harvest, 2014) 
 Blood & Ivy: The 1849 Murder That Scandalized Harvard (W W Norton & Company, 2018)

References

External links

 Identity Theory interview

1969 births
Living people
American male writers
Writers from Pennsylvania
McSweeney's
University of California, Davis alumni
College of William & Mary alumni
Portland State University faculty
People from Montgomery County, Pennsylvania